
This is a list of the 28 players who earned their 2013 European Tour card through Q School in 2012.

 2013 European Tour rookie

2013 Results

* European Tour rookie in 2013
T = Tied 
 The player retained his European Tour card for 2014 (finished inside the top 110).
 The player did not retain his European Tour card for 2014, but retained conditional status (finished between 111–145).
 The player did not retain his European Tour card for 2014 (finished outside the top 145).

Lundberg, Goya, Korhonen, and del Moral regained their cards for 2014 through Q School.

Runners-up on the European Tour in 2013
No Qualifying School graduates won on the European Tour in 2013; however, Peter Uihlein and Jin Jeong, both of whom missed the cut at Q School, won at the Madeira Islands Open - Portugal - BPI and the ISPS Handa Perth International, respectively. Uihlein finished 14th in the Race to Dubai and was named Sir Henry Cotton Rookie of the Year.

See also
2012 Challenge Tour graduates
2013 European Tour

References

External links
Final results

European Tour
European Tour Qualifying School Graduates
European Tour Qualifying School Graduates